Olivier Rossard (born 31 August 1965) is a French volleyball player. He competed at the 1988 Summer Olympics and the 1992 Summer Olympics.

References

External links
 

1965 births
Living people
French men's volleyball players
Olympic volleyball players of France
Volleyball players at the 1988 Summer Olympics
Volleyball players at the 1992 Summer Olympics
People from Les Sables-d'Olonne
Sportspeople from Vendée